Renáta Tímea "Reni" Tolvai (born 24 March 1991) is a Hungarian singer, dancer, and model. She first came to prominence in 2010 after winning the fifth season of the Hungarian show Megasztár. She has gone on to win multiple awards in Hungary, and took part in A Dal in 2012, 2016, and 2018.

Early life 
Tolvai was born as Renáta Tímea Tolvai on 24 March 1991 into the Hungarian minority in Oradea, Romania.

Music career 
In 2010, she was only 19 when besides winning the Hungarian Idol she also became the Hungarian Voice of the Year.

Her first single "Hagylak menni" appeared with a music video in the summer of 2011, on 8 August and had a great success hitting the top charts of Hungarian radio's play lists. This single brought her the trophy of "Transylvanian Music Awards" for the Best Hungarian dance-pop hit of the Year and Bravo Otto Award Video of the Year. Today this song has over 3.5 million views on YouTube.

In 2011 Reni released her debut solo album "Ékszer".

She was also one of the most nominated and awarded woman in Hungary in the past two years:

2011 Bravo Otto – Hungarian female singer of the year 
2012 Bravo Otto – Video of the year for " Hagylak menni" 
2012 Bravo Otto – Hungarian female singer of the year 
2012 Viva Comet – Female performer of the year 
2012 Transylvanian Music Awards – Best Hungarian dance-pop hit of the Year.

2013 was the year of Reni's renaissance: new management, new songs and new look. Her new and regenerative single "Playdate" brought a taste of freshness not only to her music but for the whole Hungarian pop music. Video for this single was released on 3 May.

In 2013, August a new song and video were released with Dj Metzker Viktória and No!End's assistance. The song was originally written and recorded in cooperation with CPR Production in the summer of 2012 in Chicago.

In 2014, she released her single "Shout" which has become one of the most popular hits of Reni. In March she went on US tour, where she performed in Pompano Beach and Sarasota, FL, Brooklyn, NY and Garfield, NJ. Following the tour the music video for Shout has been released.

Reni's music is generally R&B-pop, but she also incorporates electro pop, jazz and soul into her songs. She was always inspired by her idols Beyoncé and Aretha Franklin.

Personal life 
Tolvai was in a relationship with Hungarian-American singer András Kállay-Saunders. They both previously participated in Megasztár, and sang a duet on the show. They broke up in 2021.

Discography

Albums

Singles

Music videos

Television appearances 
 Megasztár – contestant
 A nagy duett – contestant
 Aktív – guest
 Mokka – guest
 Frizbi Hajdú Péterrel – guest
 Hőálló Megálló – guest
 A Dal – contestant

Awards 
 5th Megasztár – 1st Place (the Voice of the Year)(2010)
 Award for the Hungarian Culture (2011)
 Transylvanian Music Awards – the Best Hungarian dance-pop hit of the Year (2012)

See also
Hungarian pop

External links 
 Tolvai Reni Official Site
 Rio (film)
 Mahasz

1991 births
People from Oradea
Romanian musicians of Hungarian descent
21st-century Hungarian women singers
Singing talent show winners
Living people
Hungarian pop singers